Calcoed is a small village in Flintshire, Wales. It is located to the south west of the town of Holywell, to the north west of the village of Brynford and near the A55 road (North Wales Expressway). It contains the Cynfaen Memorial Methodist Chapel and several houses.

External links 

Photos of Calcoed and surrounding area on geograph.org.uk
Local website about nearby Brynford and Calcoed

Villages in Flintshire